Alex Morris (born Alexander Corfield Morris, 4 October 1977 in Barnsley, West Yorkshire, England) is an English former first-class cricketer. He was a left-handed batsman and a right-arm medium pace bowler, who, during his eight years in first-class cricket played for Yorkshire County Cricket Club and Hampshire.

Between 1994 and 1996, Morris played in thirteen Youth Test matches for England Under-19s, for whom he scored a half-century in his debut innings. Following his final Youth Test Match against New Zealand in 1996, he started playing County Championship cricket on a regular basis for Yorkshire, having made his debut the previous year. He left Yorkshire in 1997 and joined Hampshire. More recently Morris played for Nottinghamshire's Second XI.

Morris' brother, Zachary also played first-class cricket for Hampshire.

In 2010, Morris became the captain of the Hoylandswaine Cricket Club, who play in the Huddersfield Drakes Cricket League.

References

1976 births
Living people
English cricketers
Hampshire cricketers
Yorkshire cricketers
NBC Denis Compton Award recipients